Kachiyapper (Kacchiyappa Shiva āchāriyār) is a tamil temple priest who gained fame as a poet and Vedantist.

Personal life

Kachiyapper was born in a Shaivite Brahmin family and officiated as a priest in the Ekambareswarar Temple in Kanchipuram, Kumara Kottam Murugan temple, Kanchipuram.

Works

Kachiyapper was a poet and Vedantist. His greatest composition was the Kandha puranam, which is the Tamil counterpart of the Sanskrit Skanda Purana. The metres have been composed in the same style as the former. It is made up of six volumes comprising a total of 13,305 stanzas. According to Kachiyapper's preface to Parasurama  Mudaliar's Kandha purana Vachagam, the work was completed in the Saka year 700 corresponding to 778 AD.

Kandha Purānam

Kacchiyappar (Kacchiyappa Shiva āchāriyār), a Tamil and Sanskrit scholar, was a priest in the Kumara kottam temple. He composed the text Kandha Purānam. The hall, the Kandhapurāna Arangetra Mantapam (An outdoor pavilion) where Kacchiyappar composed the text still exists in the temple complex. Peacocks flock the premises even now.Kacchiyappar wrote the epic in six cantos, comprising 10,346 stanzas. It is believed that the first line of the first stanza was written by Kacchiyappar's patron deity, Murugan himself. The god is also believed to have corrected the 100 stanzas written by the priest during the day. The poet took his composition to the god and rehearsed it. Even now the priests in the temple are the descendants of Kacchiyappar.

References

Bibliography

 

Bhakti movement
Indian Shaivite religious leaders
Tamil poets